Parma Associazione Calcio had a moderately strong season in 2000–01, managing to qualify for the UEFA Champions League, but also losing the final of Coppa Italia and dropping out of the UEFA Cup too early for the board's liking, ultimately leading to coach Alberto Malesani being let go at the end of the season.

2000–01 also marked the first time in four years that Parma had to make do without star striker Hernán Crespo, who left for 2000 champions Lazio in the early summer. Sérgio Conçeicão and Matías Almeyda arrived from the Rome club as part of the transfer, but as they were midfielders Parma was staring at a potential striking crisis. Marco Di Vaio hit the back of the net 15 times, but Márcio Amoroso continued his miserable display in the Parma shirt, which saw him offloaded to Borussia Dortmund in the summer of 2001.

Still young, superstar goalkeeper Gianluigi Buffon played out his final season with the club, along with defender Lilian Thuram. Both were sold to Juventus in the summer, and their absence was clearly felt in the 2001–02 season. 2001 remains the last time Parma qualified for the Champions League.

Players

Squad information
Squad at end of season

Left club during season

Transfers

In
  Savo Milošević -  Zaragoza, €25,000,000
  Roberto Sensini -  Lazio, October
  Stephen Appiah -  Udinese
  Patrick M'Boma -  Cagliari
  Sabri Lamouchi -  Monaco
  Sérgio Conceição -  Lazio, part-exchange
  Júnior -  Palmeiras
  Johan Micoud -  Bordeaux
  Emiliano Bonazzoli -  Brescia
  Matías Almeyda -  Lazio, part-exchange
  Gianluca Falsini -  Hellas Verona

Out
  Mario Stanić -  Chelsea, 28 June, €8,960,000
  Dino Baggio -  Lazio, October, €5,164,572.72
  Hernán Crespo -  Lazio, €25,696,000 plus Matías Almeyda and Sérgio Conceição (transfer valued at €56,210,000) 
  Ariel Ortega -  River Plate, €5,681,029.99
  Roberto Breda -  Genoa
  Luigi Apolloni -  Hellas Verona
  Pietro Strada -  Cosenza
  Ousmane Dabo -  Monaco
  Saliou Lassissi -  Fiorentina
  Paolo Vanoli -  Fiorentina
  Johan Walem -  Udinese
  Michele Serena -  Internazionale

Loans out
  Davide Zoboli -  Benevento
  Raffaele Longo -  Vicenza
  Emiliano Bonazzoli -  Hellas Verona

Competitions

Overall

Last updated: 17 June 2001

Serie A

League table

Results summary

Results by round

Matches

Coppa Italia

Eightfinals

Quarter-finals

Semi-finals

Final

UEFA Cup

First round

Second round

Third round

Eightfinals

Statistics

Players statistics

Goalscorers

References

Parma Calcio 1913 seasons
Parma